Ann Marie L. Doory is an American politician who represented the 43rd legislative district in the Maryland House of Delegates from 1987 to 2010. She resigned on July 13, 2010.

Background
Ann Marie L. Doory was born in Yonkers, New York, on August 19, 1954. She attended St. Mary's Academy in Leonardtown, Maryland, graduating in 1972. She majored in political science at Towson State University, earning her B.A. in 1976. Three years later, she graduated from the University of Baltimore School of Law, earning a Juris Doctor in 1979. As an attorney, she is a member of the Maryland State and Women's Bar Associations.

Prior to running for office, she served as counsel to the Majority Leader of the Maryland State Senate (1981) and was elected to the Maryland Democratic State Central Committee from Baltimore City in 1982, serving until her successful run for the Maryland House of Delegates in 1986. In the 2006 campaign, Doory joined with 43rd district incumbents Senator Joan Carter Conway, and Delegates Maggie McIntosh and Curt Anderson to defeat a field of six other challengers. The team knocked on more than 20,000 doors, mailed nearly 100,000 thousand pieces of literature and defeated all challengers in both the primary and general elections.

Legislative career 

In the House of Delegates, Doory serves as vice-chairman of the Ways and Means Committee and a member of the Rules and Executive Nominations Committee. Doory was also a member of the Article 27 (crimes & punishments) Revision Committee, the Joint Committee on Investigation and Deputy Speaker Pro Tem from 1999 to 2003. Earlier in her legislative career she was the House Parliamentarian from 1993 to 1994 and chairman of the Women Legislators of Maryland from 2001 to 2002. She was the lead sponsor of a bill ensuring a 48-hour hospital stay for mothers and newborns after birth, the first law of its kind in the country and lead Sponsor of a bill to require the development of child resistant handgun technology, which ultimately led to the Gun Safety Act of 2000.

Personal life

Doory is a board member of the  Homeland Association Citizens on Patrol, the House of Ruth, the Central Maryland Council of Girl Scouts and the Good Samaritan Hospital. She is married to Robert Doory and has two children and two grandchildren, Grace (4) and Alden (2).

Legislative notes

2008
Primary sponsor the Flexible Leave Act of 2008 (HB40)

2007
Voted for the Clean Indoor Air Act of 2007 (HB359)
 Voted in favor the Tax Reform Act of 2007(HB2) 
 Voted in favor of prohibiting ground rents in 2007(SB106)
 Voted in favor of Higher Education -Tuition Charges-Maryland High School Students in 2007 (HB6)
 Voted in favor of Slots (HB4) in the 2007 Special session

2006
Voted for the Healthy Air Act in 2006 (SB154)

2005
 Voted against slots in 2005 (HB1361)
Primary sponsor, Program Open Space Funds (HB415)

1998
Voted for income tax reduction in 1998 (SB750)

Past election results
2006 Race for Maryland House of Delegates – 43rd District
Voters to choose three:
{| class="wikitable"
|-
!Name
!Votes
!Percent
!Outcome
|-
|- 
|Curt Anderson, Democratic
|22,315
|  29.4%
|   Won
|-
|- 
|Maggie McIntosh, Democratic
|22,093 
|  29.1%
|   Won
|-
|- 
|Ann Marie Doory, Democratic
|21,219
|  28.0%
|   Won
|-
|- 
|Armand F. Girard, Republican
|3,425 
|  4.5%
|   Lost
|-
|- 
|David G.S. Greene, Green
|2,619
|  3.5%
|   Lost
|-
|- 
|Brandy Baker, Green
|2,267 
|  3.0%
|   Lost
|-
|- 
|Richard J. Ochs, Green
|1,772
|  2.3%
|   Lost
|-
|}
2002 Race for Maryland House of Delegates – 43rd District
Voters to choose three:
{| class="wikitable"
|-
!Name
!Votes
!Percent
!Outcome
|-
|- 
|Maggie McIntosh, Democratic
|21,993 
|  32.5%
|   Won
|-
|- 
|Curt Anderson, Democratic
|21,131
|  30.8%
|   Won
|-
|- 
|Ann Marie Doory, Democratic
|19,999
|  29.15%
|   Won
|-
|- 
|John A. Heath, Republican
|5,243 
|  7.64%
|   Lost
|-
|- 
|Morning Sunday, Green(Write-In)
|152
|  .22%
|   Lost
|-
|- 
|Other Write-Ins
|97 
|  .14%
|   Lost
|-
|}

References

External links
 Official House of Delegates biography

Democratic Party members of the Maryland House of Delegates
Maryland lawyers
Living people
1954 births
Women state legislators in Maryland
Towson University alumni
University of Baltimore School of Law alumni
People from Yonkers, New York
21st-century American politicians
21st-century American women politicians